"Our Velocity" is a song by English indie rock band Maxïmo Park. It was released on 19 March 2007 as the lead single from their second studio album, Our Earthly Pleasures (2007). The music was written by guitarist Duncan Lloyd and the lyrics by lead singer Paul Smith. According to Smith, the song is about the wars that the UK was involved in at the time, such as Afghanistan and Iraq.

"Our Velocity" became Maxïmo Park's first UK Top 10 single, reaching number 9 on 25 March 2007 on the UK Singles Chart and number 1 on the UK Indie Chart within a week of its physical release.

Critical reception
The song has been highly regarded and in VH1's "50 Greatest Songs of 2007 So Far", it placed at number 1. Teletext's music page Planet Sound named "Our Velocity" as the best single of 2007.

Music video
The music video was directed by Nima Nourizadeh. It features the band being multiplied in a white room while playing the song.

Usage in media
In August 2007, a segment of "Our Velocity" was used as the title music for the BBC's coverage of Reading and Leeds Festival.

The song was featured on Hollyoaks in 2007. It is also included in the video games Project Gotham Racing 4 (2007) and Guitar Hero: On Tour Modern Hits (2009).

Track listings
 CD:
 "Our Velocity"
 "Distance Makes"
 "Mary O'Brien"

 7-inch white vinyl:
 "Our Velocity"
 "Pride Before a Fall"

 7-inch red vinyl:
 "Our Velocity"
 "Robert Altman"

 1st-week-only download:
 "Our Velocity" (home demo version)
 "Our Velocity" (first live performance)

Certifications

References

External links
 "Our Velocity" music video at YouTube

2007 singles
2007 songs
Maxïmo Park songs
Song recordings produced by Gil Norton
Songs written by Duncan Lloyd
Songs written by Paul Smith (rock vocalist)
Warp (record label) singles